The Royal Canadian Logistics Service (RCLS) is a personnel branch of the Canadian Armed Forces (CAF).

In April 1997, the CF Armed Forces Council decided to incorporate the Personnel Administration Branch into the Logistics Branch.

From 1968 to 2018 the organization was named the Logistics Branch. On October 16, 2018, on the occasion on its 50th anniversary, the Logistics Branch received its "Royal" designation from Queen Elizabeth II becoming the Royal Canadian Logistics Service.

Unification
When the Canadian Army, Royal Canadian Navy, and Royal Canadian Air Force were merged in 1968 to form the Canadian Armed Forces, the administrative corps of the Canadian Army were deactivated and merged with their naval and air force counterparts to ultimately form the Canadian Forces Logistics Branch. 
 The Royal Canadian Army Service Corps transport and supply elements were combined with the Royal Canadian Ordnance Corps to form the Logistics Branch
 The Royal Canadian Postal Corps and  Royal Canadian Army Service Corps  clerical trades  were merged to form the Administration Branch (later merged with the Logistics Branch)

Uniform
The officers that belong to the corps wear a metallic embroidered or composite cap badge, while the non-commissioned members (NCM) wear a cloth-like version on berets and Air Force wedge caps; however, Navy NCMs wear a solid-metal version on their service caps and bowlers.

Training

Canadian Forces Logistics Training Centre
Canadian Forces Logistics Training Centre (CFLTC) (formerly known as Canadian Forces School of Administration and Logistics or CFSAL) has an establishment of 181 military and 14 civilian personnel and is organized into a headquarters and six divisions:

Supply and Food Service Training Division;
Financial and Human Resources Training Division; 
Transportation and Traffic Training Division; 
Postal Training Cadre (CFB Trenton);
Music Training Division; 
Explosives Training Division; and
Logistics Leadership Division, which oversees Officer and Advanced Training.

Each year, CFLTC trains approximately 3,000 military members (both Regular and Reserve Force) and civilians. CFLTC provides entry-level training to logistics officers from all three environments. In addition, CFLTC trains the following sub-occupations for logistics officers: supply chain management, financial management, human resources management, fleet management and food services.

CFLTC trains the following occupations for non-commissioned members: human resources administrator, financial service administrator, cook, material management technician, ammunition technician, traffic technician, mobile support equipment operator, and musician.

Order of precedence

References

External links

Canadian Armed Forces personnel branches
Organizations based in Canada with royal patronage
Military logistics of Canada
Military units and formations established in 1968